Myrtle Township is an inactive township in Knox County, in the U.S. state of Missouri.

Myrtle Township was established in 1872.

References

Townships in Missouri
Townships in Knox County, Missouri